The Scottish Rite Cathedral, now named the Scottish Rite Theatre, is church-style building in Peoria, Illinois that houses the Scottish Rite Bodies of the Valley of Peoria.  The building is at 400 NE Perry Avenue, at the corner with Spalding Avenue.  The cathedral is listed as a contributing property to Peoria's North Side Historic District.

The Scottish Rite Bodies of the Valley of Peoria was established in Yates City, Illinois on 25 February 1867, and moved to Peoria in 1869.  The body had 3 meeting locations in downtown Peoria before the Scottish Rite Cathedral.  The cornerstone for the Scottish Rite Cathedral was laid on 7 May 1924.

The cathedral design features flying buttresses and symbolic stained glass windows.  The cathedral has an auditorium with a stage and 900 seats.

The Masonic membership in the Valley of Peoria was near 15,000 at one time, but had dropped to 1,200 by 2019, and was having trouble affording the maintenance of the building.  Kim Blickenstaff, who grew up in nearby East Peoria, bought the Cathedral on April 26, 2019, for $490,000, with plans to put it in a trust, operate it as a community venue, and allow Scottish Rite members to use the venue in perpetuity.

References

External links

 Scottish Rite Theatre — official site
  — former official site

Organizations established in 1867
Masonic buildings completed in 1924
1920s architecture in the United States
Buildings and structures in Peoria, Illinois
Clubhouses on the National Register of Historic Places in Illinois
Historic district contributing properties in Illinois
Masonic buildings in Illinois
National Register of Historic Places in Peoria County, Illinois